Julian Walker Six Time World Champion
  Danny Webb
  Anthony West
  Jock West 
  David Whitworth
  Peter Williams
  Warren Willing
  Mark Willis
  Martin Wimmer
  Russel Wood 
  Tommy Wood
  Derek Woodman

 W